The 1988 Maine Black Bears football team was an American football team that represented the University of Maine as a member of the Yankee Conference during the 1988 NCAA Division I-AA football season. In their second and final season under head coach Tim Murphy, the Black Bears compiled a 7–4 record (4–4 against conference opponents) and finished in a four-way tie for third place in the Yankee Conference. Nick Penna was the team captain.

Schedule

References

Maine
Maine Black Bears football seasons
Maine Black Bears football